Einojuhani Rautavaara's six Etydit (Études), Op. 42 were composed in 1969. According to the composer, the intent in writing these works, each of which explores a single interval, was to "...reintroduce a sonorous, broad piano style using the entire compass of the keyboard, presenting this wonderful instrument in its full abundance." Matambo, in her study of the composer's solo piano works, noted that the composer also referred to the works as "interval experiments", and that with the exception of the first of the études all of the pieces exploit dissonance.

 (Thirds)
 (Sevenths)
 (Tritones)
 (Fourths)
 (Seconds)
 (Fifths)

References 

Notes

Sources

External links 
 

Compositions by Einojuhani Rautavaara
Piano compositions in the 20th century
1969 compositions
Rautavaara